David Davidson Hay (1828 – 1908) was an Ontario political figure. He represented Perth North in the Legislative Assembly of Ontario from 1875 to 1883 as a Liberal member.

He was born in Dundee, Scotland in 1828. In 1849, he married Jane Rogerson. He served as reeve for Elma Township and Listowel. Hay was Immigration Commissioner to Scotland for Ontario from 1873 to 1874 and General Immigration Agent for Ontario from 1874 to 1875. He ran unsuccessfully for the same seat in the provincial assembly in 1867. Hay moved to Stratford in 1884 after he was named registrar of deeds for North Perth.

His nephew F. Wellington Hay later served in the provincial assembly and the House of Commons.

External links 
''The Canadian parliamentary companion and annual register, 1880', CH Mackintosh

History of Perth County to 1967, WS & HJM Johnston (1967)

1828 births
1908 deaths
Ontario Liberal Party MPPs
Scottish emigrants to pre-Confederation Ontario
People from Perth County, Ontario
Politicians from Dundee